Battalion 1944 is a multiplayer first-person shooter video game developed by Bulkhead Interactive and published by Square Enix Collective and released for Windows. The game was announced via a Kickstarter campaign in February 2016, and released on 23 May 2019. The game is set during World War II and runs on Unreal Engine 4. Bulkhead is a collaborative effort between companies Deco Digital and Bevel Studios. Versions for the PlayStation 4 and Xbox One were also announced but never released.

Development
The game's crowdfunding campaign was successfully funded in under three days. In the announcement, Bulkhead Interactive stated that the game would feature dedicated servers while making use of certain anti-cheat measures. The game was released on early access on 1 February 2018, and officially released on 23 May 2019.

Controversy 
The project ended up being very controversial after the developers failed to launch the promised console versions despite selling keys for PlayStation 4 and Xbox One digital copies during the Kickstarter campaign. The development focused fully on the PC version and thousands of console gamers were left out of pocket with no game and no communication from Bulkhead. The console version was officially cancelled on August 9, 2022, with the PC version going free to play.

References

External links
 

2019 video games
Kickstarter-funded video games
Multiplayer and single-player video games
PlayStation 4 games
Tactical shooter video games
Unreal Engine games
Video games developed in the United Kingdom
Windows games
World War II first-person shooters
Xbox One games
Square Enix games